Augustus Carp, Esq., By Himself: Being the Autobiography of a Really Good Man is a satire, originally anonymous, first published in the United Kingdom in May 1924 and, later that year, by Houghton Mifflin in the United States. The author was an English physician, Sir Henry Howarth Bashford (1880–1961), and the illustrations were by "Robin" (Marjorie Blood).

In his preface to a 1986 edition of the book, Anthony Burgess wrote: 

The book you have in your hands or hand or on your knee is one of the great comic novels of the twentieth century.

In the same edition of that book, Frank Muir wrote:

One of those little masterpieces that seems to pop up from nowhere: a sovereign cure for morbid thoughts and lack of lustre.

Kenneth Williams also greatly enjoyed the book:

I had a great deal of trouble at the microphone when I read Augustus Carp for the BBC, caused by the need to stifle my laughter.

References

External links
Full text of the novel with illustrations
Review of Augustus Carp, Esq. on The Neglected Books Page

1924 books
Satirical books